Crutcher House, on Mulberry Pike in Eminence in Henry County, Kentucky, was listed on the National Register of Historic Places in 1980.

It is a five-bay two-story frame I-house which was built as a farmhouse in about 1870 in a then-rural setting.  It has a two-story ell and a one-story addition (the latter added c.1968).  It has Italianate brackets under its eaves, and pilasters at the entrance bay and at its four corners.

It was deemed significant as "the town's most significant remaining example of late 19th-century residential architecture."

References

I-houses in Kentucky
National Register of Historic Places in Henry County, Kentucky
Houses completed in 1870
Houses in Henry County, Kentucky
Houses on the National Register of Historic Places in Kentucky
1870 establishments in Kentucky